Breuil-Romain is a railway station located in the French municipality of Breuil-sur-Vesle, in the département of Marne.

Services 
The station is served by TER Grand Est trains between Reims and Fismes (line C11) operated by the SNCF.

References 

Railway stations in Marne (department)